In algebraic geometry, a tetrahedroid (or tétraédroïde) is a special kind of Kummer surface studied by , with the property that the intersections with the faces of a fixed tetrahedron are given by two conics intersecting in four nodes. Tetrahedroids generalize Fresnel's wave surface.

References

Algebraic surfaces
Complex surfaces